Turtle Soup is the debut album by the British indie rock band The Mock Turtles, released in June 1990.

The album shares its name with the 1969 record Turtle Soup, released by the American psychedelic rock band The Turtles.

Track listing
All songs written by Martin Coogan except where noted.
 "Kathy Come Home" — 3:02
 "Head Run Wild" — 3:27
 "Lay Me Down" — 4:05
 "Another Jesus Walks on Water" (Coogan, Martin Glyn Murray) — 2:52
 "Oh Helen How?" — 3:10
 "How Does It Feel?" — 3:19
 "And Then She Smiles" — 3:13
 "Willow Song" (traditional) — 3:56
 "Mary's Garden" — 3:47
 "Can You Dig It?" — 3:52
 "Wicker Man" — 3:40

Personnel

 Martin Coogan — vocals, guitars
 Steve Cowen — drums
 Joanne Gent — keyboards
 Andrew Stewardson — bass
 Martin Glyn Murray — guitars

Charts

|-

|}

References

1991 debut albums
The Mock Turtles albums
Imaginary Records albums